Maurice Hubert Stans (March 22, 1908April 14, 1998) was an American accountant, civil servant, and political organizer who served as the 19th United States Secretary of Commerce from 1969 to 1972. He served as the finance chairman for the Committee for the Re-Election of the President, working for the re-election of Richard Nixon. He was convicted on multiple counts under the Federal Election Campaign Act that were revealed during the larger investigation into the Watergate scandal.

Early life and education
Stans was born on March 22, 1908 in Shakopee, Minnesota, the son of James Hubert Stans and Mathilda Stans (nee Nyssen). His father was the only child of Jan Hendrik Stans and Maria Catharina Crijns, a Belgian couple who immigrated to the United States in 1880. Stans graduated from Shakopee High School in 1925. He worked at a local foundry before traveling to Chicago to find work with friend, Otto F. Schultz. The same year, he began work as a stenographer and bookkeeper for a Chicago importer, while attending evening classes at Northwestern University. In 1928 he joined the Chicago-based firm of Alexander Grant and Company, certified public accountants, and continued his part-time studies at Columbia University while working at the firm's New York City office. He attended Columbia from 1928 to 1930.

Career 
Stans was an executive partner with the Alexander Grant & Co. accounting firm in Chicago from 1940 until 1955. He was a Certified Public Accountant, licensed in New York, Ohio and Virginia. He was President of the American Institute of Accountants from 1954 to 1955 and won the Gold Medal for Distinguished Service to the Profession in 1954. He was inducted into the Accounting Hall of Fame in 1960.

Public servant under Eisenhower and Nixon 

He later served as U.S. deputy postmaster general from 1955 to 1957, in the Dwight Eisenhower administration. He served as deputy director of the Bureau of the Budget from 1957 to 1958, and director of the Bureau of the Budget from 1958 to 1961, still under Eisenhower. He joined the Nixon administration as secretary of commerce from 1969 to 1972. 
In 1961, Stans was one of the founders of the African Wildlife Foundation.

Watergate 

In mid-February 1972, Stans resigned as the secretary of commerce to chair the Committee for the Re-Election of the President (CRP), Richard Nixon's re-election campaign. Money that he raised for the campaign was clearly used to finance some or all of the illegal Watergate activities. Stans denied any knowledge of what the money was used for, only that it was authorized to be spent. 

On March 12, 1975, Stans pleaded guilty to three counts of violating the reporting sections of the Federal Election Campaign Act and two counts of accepting illegal campaign contributions. He was fined $5,000. The convictions were related to improperly giving campaign funds to G. Gordon Liddy, though Stans insisted that his guilt ended there and that he was not aware of Liddy's plan to use the money for what became the Watergate break in.

He later authored a book, The Terrors of Justice: The Untold Side of Watergate, in which he detailed his side of the Watergate story.

Personal life
Stans died at the Huntington Memorial Hospital in Pasadena, California on April 14, 1998, at age 90, following a congestive heart failure.

References

External links
Papers of Maurice H. Stans, Dwight D. Eisenhower Presidential Library

|-

1908 births
1998 deaths
20th-century American politicians
American accountants
California politicians convicted of crimes
California Republicans
Directors of the Office of Management and Budget
Eisenhower administration cabinet members
Illinois Republicans
Members of the Committee for the Re-Election of the President
New York (state) Republicans
Nixon administration cabinet members
People convicted in the Watergate scandal
People from Shakopee, Minnesota
United States Secretaries of Commerce
Writers from Minnesota